is a female Japanese popular music artist.

Discography

Singles 
 'Showa Kissa' (3/20/1999)
 'Tabi no Yado' (9/20/2000)

Albums 
 Do za Puroretaria Dansu (8/21/1999)

External links 
  - The official website

Japanese women singers
Japanese pop musicians
Living people
Musicians from Ōita Prefecture
Year of birth missing (living people)